The Libertarian Party of California (LPC) is the California affiliate of the national Libertarian Party (LP). The party chairwoman is Mimi Robson, and is based in Sacramento, California, in Sacramento County. As of 2016 Libertarians represent approximately 0.7% of the state's registered voters.

History

In 1972 the party considered suing county clerks in Placer and Butte counties for refusing to allow voters to register as Libertarians. In 1978 Ed Clark, who had been the affiliate's chairman from 1973 to 1974 and later the national presidential candidate in 1980, ran as an independent for governor of California to gain party recognition and received over five percent. However, the Secretary of State ruled that the two percent requirement was for retaining party recognition and not gaining party recognition and that since Clark had run as an independent and not a Libertarian it would not count either way. The party filed a lawsuit against the decision, but it was first dismissed then ruled against on appeal. The Libertarian Party of California has hosted the Libertarian National Convention in 1977, 1979, 1980, and in 2000.

Current officials
All current Libertarian Party elected officials are in "nonpartisan" elected offices, meaning that the candidates' partisan affiliation is not listed on the ballot.
 Scott Wooden – Del Mar Union School District board member
 Kent Fowler – Feather River Recreation and Park District board member
 James Guadagni – Liberty School District board member
 Vern Dahl – Lucia Mar Unified School District board member
 Susan Marie Weber – Palm Desert City councilor
 Brian Holtz – Purisima Hills Water District board member
 Kate O'Brien – Rancho Simi Recreation and Park District board member
 John Harrington – San Gabriel city councilor
 Jack Hickey – Sequoia Hospital Healthcare board member
 Jonathan D. Hall – Tehachapi Cummings Water District board member
 Robert Dickson – Timber Cove Fire Protection District board member
 John Camera – Van Nuys Neighborhood councilor
 Wallace Stewart – Vista Fire Protection board member

Former officials

 Jeff Hewitt – District 5 Riverside County Supervisor board member (2019–2023) and former Calimesa city councilmember and Mayor
 Art Olivier – Bellflower city councilor and mayor (1994–1997; 1998–1999)

Electoral performance

Senate Class I

Senate Class III

Gubernatorial

Lieutenant Gubernatorial

Attorney General

Secretary of State

State Treasurer

State Controller

Insurance Commissioner

State Assembly

Voter registration
Libertarian voter registration in the state of California has experienced significant growth.

Governance
The Libertarian Party of California is a "political party that has detailed statutory provisions applicable to its operation", which are in division 7, part 3 of the California Elections Code. The Libertarian State Central Committee, the governing body of the Libertarian Party of California, functions pursuant to its standing rules and bylaws.  The regular officers of the Central Committee are the chairman, two regional vice chairmen, secretary, and treasurer.

County central committees
There are semi-autonomous county central committees for many of California's 58 counties. The counties which currently have active affiliates are as follows:

 Alameda
 Contra Costa
 El Dorado
 Kern
 Kings
 Los Angeles
 Monterey
 Nevada
 Orange
 Placer
 Riverside
 Sacramento
 San Bernardino
 San Diego
 San Francisco
 San Mateo
 Santa Clara
 Ventura
 Yolo

Notes

References

External links

 Libertarian Party of California
 Libertarian Party of California on Twitter

California
Libertarian Party